Henry Butler was an American jazz and blues pianist.

Henry Butler may also refer to:

Henry Butler, Lord of Umallia (died 1272), founder of Burrishoole
Henry Butler (MP) (fl. 1460–1485), Member of Parliament (MP) for Coventry
Henry Butler (viol player) (died 1652), English composer and viol player
Henry Butler, 2nd Earl of Carrick (1746–1813), Irish peer and politician
Henry G. Butler (1769–1847), magistrate and politician in Newfoundland
Henry Butler, 13th Viscount Mountgarret (1816–1900)
Henry Butler (politician) (1821–1885), Tasmanian politician, Speaker of the House
Henry Montagu Butler (1833–1918), English academic
Henry Butler, 14th Viscount Mountgarret (1844–1912), British aristocrat
Henry John Butler (1889–1922), Australian aviator
Henry Butler (hurler) (born 1948), Irish hurler
Henry N. Butler (born 1954), economist

See also

Harry Butler (disambiguation)
Henry Butler-Johnstone (1809–1879), British politician
Henry Munro-Butler-Johnstone (1837–1902), British author and Conservative Party politician